The Experimenterende Danske Radioamatører (EDR) (in English, Danish Amateur Radio Experimenters) is a national non-profit organization for amateur radio enthusiasts in Denmark.  Membership benefits of EDR include the sponsorship of amateur radio operating awards and radio contests, and a QSL bureau for those members who communicate with amateur radio operators in other countries.

EDR represents the interests of Danish amateur radio operators before Danish and international telecommunications regulatory authorities.  EDR is the national member society representing Denmark in the International Amateur Radio Union.

EDR publishes a membership magazine called OZ.

See also 
International Amateur Radio Union

References 

Denmark
Clubs and societies in Denmark
Organizations established in 1927
1927 establishments in Denmark
Organizations based in Odense